The Sand Creek massacre (also known as the Chivington massacre, the battle of Sand Creek or the massacre of Cheyenne Indians) was a massacre of Cheyenne and Arapaho people by the U.S. Army in the American Indian Wars that occurred on November 29, 1864, when a 675-man force of the Third Colorado Cavalry under the command of U.S. Volunteers Colonel John Chivington attacked and destroyed a village of Cheyenne and Arapaho people in southeastern Colorado Territory, killing and mutilating an estimated 69 to over 600 Native American people.   Chivington claimed 500 to 600 warriors were killed. However, most sources estimate around 150 people were killed, about two-thirds of whom were women and children. The location has been designated the Sand Creek Massacre National Historic Site and is administered by the National Park Service. The massacre is considered part of a series of events known as the Colorado Wars.

Background

Treaty of Fort Laramie
By the terms of the 1851 Treaty of Fort Laramie between the United States and seven Indian nations, including the Cheyenne and Arapaho, the United States recognized that the Cheyenne and Arapaho held a vast territory encompassing the lands between the North Platte River and the Arkansas River, and eastward from the Rocky Mountains to western Kansas. This area included present-day southeastern Wyoming, southwestern Nebraska, most of eastern Colorado, and the westernmost portions of Kansas.

In November 1858, however, the discovery of gold in the Rocky Mountains in Colorado, then part of the Kansas Territory, brought on the Pikes Peak Gold Rush.  Immigrants flooded across Cheyenne and Arapaho lands.  They competed for resources, and some settlers tried to stay. Colorado territorial officials pressured federal authorities to redefine the extent of Indian lands in the territory, and in the fall of 1860, A.B. Greenwood, Commissioner of Indian Affairs, arrived at Bent's New Fort, along the Arkansas River, to negotiate a new treaty.

Native lands restricted
On February 18, 1861, six chiefs of the Southern Cheyenne and four of the Arapaho signed the Treaty of Fort Wise with the United States, in which they ceded most of the lands designated to them by the Fort Laramie treaty. The Cheyenne chiefs included Black Kettle, White Antelope (Vó'kaa'e Ohvó'komaestse), Lean Bear, Little Wolf, and Tall Bear; the Arapaho chiefs included Little Raven, Storm, Shave-Head, Big Mouth, and Niwot, or Left Hand.  The Cheyenne warriors denounced the chiefs who signed the treaty and even threatened them with death if they attempted to carry out the treaty's provisions.

The new reserve, less than 1/13th the size of the territory recognized in the 1851 treaty, was located in eastern Colorado, between the Arkansas River and Sand Creek. Most bands of the Cheyenne, including the Dog Soldiers, a militaristic band of Cheyenne and Lakota that had originated in the late 1830s, were angry at the chiefs who had signed the treaty. They disavowed the treaty—which never received the blessing of the Council of 44, the supreme tribal authority—and refused to abide by its constraints. They continued to live and hunt in the bison-rich lands of eastern Colorado and western Kansas, and became increasingly belligerent over the tide of white migration across their lands. Tensions were high, particularly in the Smoky Hill River country of Kansas, along which whites had opened a new trail to the gold fields. Cheyenne who opposed the treaty said it had been signed by a small minority of the chiefs without the consent or approval of the rest of the tribe, that the signatories had not understood what they signed, and that they had been bribed to sign by a large distribution of gifts. Officials took the position that Indians who refused to abide by it were hostile and planning a war. The Cheyenne started committing minor offenses in 1861. These offenses went unpunished and, subsequently, became more significant. The desire for war was so strong with the Cheyenne that Agent Lorey urged Governor John Evans to treat with the Cheyenne anew in 1863. As agreed, Governor Evans went out to meet with the chiefs, but they did not show up to the appointed place. The governor sent his guide, Elbridge Gerry, out to try to find the chiefs. Gerry returned two weeks later saying that a council had been held wherein the chiefs decided not to meet with Governor Evans. Bull Bear offered to meet with the governor, but his warriors would not allow it.

Escalation of hostilities
At the end of 1863 and in the beginning of 1864, word was received that a coalition was to be formed among the plains tribes to "drive the whites out of the country." In the spring and summer of 1864, the Sioux, Comanches, Kiowas, Cheyennes, and Arapahos were engaged in active hostilities which led to the murder of numerous civilians, the destruction of livestock and crops, supplies to the region being cut off, and the Colorado settlers in danger of starvation or murder at the hands of the plains tribes.

On April 13, a herdsman working for Irving, Jackmann & Company reported that Cheyennes and Arapahos had driven off 60 oxen and 12 horses and mules from their camp south of Denver. A small contingent of soldiers, led by Lieutenant Clark Dunn, was sent to repossess the livestock. The ensuing confrontation resulted in the death of four of the soldiers, and the tribes maintained possession of the stolen livestock.

On May 16, less than 15 months after meeting President Lincoln in Washington, Lean Bear, Black Kettle, and others in the tribe were camping on their buffalo hunting grounds near Ash Creek. The 1st Colorado Regiment, under the command of Lieutenant George Eayre, approached the group. Positive that this would be a peaceful encounter, Lean Bear went alone to meet the militia to show his peaceful intentions. On his chest, Lean Bear proudly wore his peace medal that he had received on his trip to Washington D.C. in 1863. In his hand, he held an official document signed by Lincoln stating that he was peaceful and friendly with whites. What Lean Bear did not realize was that Eayre's troops were operating under orders from Colonel John M. Chivington to "kill Cheyennes whenever and wherever found." Eayre ordered his men to shoot Lean Bear, who was wounded and fell off his horse. He was then shot repeatedly by the soldiers as they rode past his body on the ground. Newspaper reports and books from the era report that Cheyenne warriors attacked settlers and committed a number of atrocities in the summer of 1864 including the June 11 Hungate massacre .

The beginning of the American Civil War in 1861 led to the organization of military forces in Colorado Territory. However, the attention of the federal government was firmly fixed on defeating the Confederates. As a result, there was no significant military protection of wagon trains, settlers, settlements, communication lines, and supply wagons in the region. By the summer of 1864, nearly every stage was being attacked, emigrants were being cut off, and settlements were being raided continually. The settlers abandoned their farms and ranches and began seeking refuge in the major settlements such as Denver. A coordinated attack was carried out on August 8, 1864, where all the existing stage lines in the region were attacked. Between August 11 and September 7, Governor Evans sent multiple letters to Secretary of War Edward Stanton in an attempt to furnish military aid, but Stanton was unable to pull the Second Colorado Volunteers, led by Colonel Ford, off of the eastern Civil War front.  As a result of the repeated calls for aid, authorization was granted to call up "one-hundred-days' men" to form the Third Colorado Volunteers.

In 1864, before the events of the Massacre of Sand Creek, there were 32 Indian attacks on record. These resulted in the death of 96 settlers, 21 being wounded, and eight being captured. Between 250 and 300 head of livestock were stolen, 12 wagon trains and stagecoaches were attacked, robbed, or destroyed, and nine ranches and settlements were raided.

Governor Evans promises war
As the conflict between the Indians and settlers and soldiers in Colorado continued, the tribes would make war during the spring and summer months until subsistence became difficult to obtain. The tribes would then earnestly seek to make peace during the winter months, when they would stock up on supplies, arms, and munitions, until fairer weather would return and the war could be commenced anew. In July 1864, Colorado Governor John Evans sent a circular to the Plains Indians, inviting those who were friendly to go to a place of safety at Fort Lyon on the eastern plains, where their people would be given provisions and protection by the United States troops. The circular itself was dated June 27, 1864. It wasn't until three months later, September 28, that the Cheyenne came to Denver to have peace talks with Governor Evans. At this conference, the chiefs were told by Governor Evans that peace was not possible at that point and that "whatever peace they make must be with the soldiers, and not with me." At this council, White Antelope said that he feared the soldiers might kill some of his people while he was there. Governor Evans told him that there was great danger of it, and then he told White Antelope that one of the military chiefs (Colonel Chivington) was present and could tell the tribes what was necessary to secure peace. Governor Evans made clear that the purpose of the circular was not to extend peace, but rather it was an attempt to bring in the Indians who were friendly and were exposed to repudiation by the other tribes as a result. The messages given by the white negotiators at the September 28th meeting were highly contradictory. On the one hand, Governor Evans told the chiefs, "The time when you can make war best is in the summer; when I can make war best is in the winter. You, so far, have had the advantage. My time is just coming." On the other hand, Colonel Chivington told the assembled Chiefs that if they sought peace, they should come to Fort Lyon and be under the protection of Major Wynkoop. 652 Arapahos led by Chief Little Raven appeared at Fort Lyon beginning around November 6, 1864, and were subsisted there by Major Anthony who had replaced  Wynkoop. Later, when 600 Cheyenne appeared at the fort in a similar manner they were turned away and denied subsistence by Major Anthony.

Attack

The Cheyenne camp near Fort Lyon
Black Kettle, leading chief of around 163 mostly Southern Cheyenne, had led his band, joined by some Arapahos under Chief Niwot, to Fort Lyon in compliance with provisions of a peace parley held in Denver in September 1864. After a while, the American Indians were asked to relocate to Big Sandy Creek, less than 40 miles northwest of Fort Lyon, under the threat of their safety. The Dog Soldiers, who had been responsible for many of the attacks and raids on whites, were not part of this encampment.

Most tribal warriors stood their ground, refusing to leave their home under the guise of a threat, leaving only about 75 men, plus all the women and children in the village. The men who remained were mostly too old or too young to hunt. Black Kettle flew a U.S. flag, with a white flag tied beneath it, over his lodge, as the Fort Lyon commander had advised him. This was to show he was friendly and forestall any attack by the Colorado soldiers. Peace chief Ochinee, who tried to broker peace for the Cheyenne, was among those who were killed. Ochinee and 160 other people, most of whom were children and women, were killed.

Chivington attacks the camp
Meanwhile, Chivington and 425 men of the 3rd Colorado Cavalry rode to Fort Lyon arriving on November 28, 1864. Once at the fort, Chivington took command of 250 men of the 1st Colorado Cavalry and maybe as many as 12 men of the 1st Regiment New Mexico Volunteer Infantry, then set out for Black Kettle's encampment. James Beckwourth, a noted frontiersman who had lived with the Indians for half a century, acted as guide for Chivington. Prior to the massacre, several of Anthony's officers were not eager to join in the attack. Captain Silas Soule, Lieutenant Joseph Cramer and Lieutenant James Connor protested that attacking a peaceful camp would violate the pledge of safety provided to the Indians and would dishonor the uniform of the Army.

The following morning, Chivington gave the order to attack. Two officers, Captain Silas Soule and Lieutenant Joseph Cramer, commanding Company D and Company K of the First Colorado Cavalry, refused to obey and told their men to hold fire. However, the rest of Chivington's men immediately attacked the village. Ignoring the U.S. flag and a white flag that was run up shortly after the attack began, they murdered as many of the Indians as they could.

The natives, lacking artillery, could not make much resistance. Some of the natives cut horses from the camp's herd and fled up Sand Creek or to a nearby Cheyenne camp on the headwaters of the Smoky Hill River. Others, including trader George Bent, fled upstream and dug holes in the sand beneath the banks of the stream. They were pursued by the troops and fired on, but many survived. Cheyenne warrior Morning Star said that most of the Indian dead were killed by cannon fire, especially those firing from the south bank of the river at the people retreating up the creek.

In testimony before a Congressional committee investigating the massacre, Chivington claimed that as many as 500 to 600 Indian warriors were killed. Historian Alan Brinkley wrote that 133 Indians were killed, 105 of whom were women and children. White eyewitness John S. Smith reported that 70 to 80 Indians were killed, including 20 to 30 warriors, which agrees with Brinkley's figure as to the number of men killed. George Bent, the son of the American William Bent and a Cheyenne mother, who was in the village when the attack came and was wounded by the soldiers, gave two different accounts of the natives' loss. On March 15, 1889, he wrote to Samuel F. Tappan that 137 people were killed: 28 men and 109 women and children. However, on April 30, 1913, when he was very old, he wrote that "about 53 men" and "110 women and children" were killed and many people wounded.

Although initial reports indicated 10 soldiers killed and 38 wounded, the final tally was 4 killed and 21 wounded in the 1st Colorado Cavalry and 20 killed or mortally wounded and 31 other wounded in the 3rd Colorado Cavalry; adding up to 24 killed and 52 wounded. Dee Brown wrote that some of Chivington's men were drunk and that many of the soldiers' casualties were due to friendly fire, but neither of these claims is supported by Gregory F. Michno or Stan Hoig in their books devoted to the massacre.

Before Chivington and his men left the area, they plundered the teepees and took the horses. After the smoke cleared, Chivington's men came back and killed many of the wounded. They also scalped many of the dead, regardless of whether they were women, children, or infants. Chivington and his men dressed their weapons, hats, and gear with scalps and other body parts, including human fetuses and male and female genitalia. They also publicly displayed these battle trophies in Denver's Apollo Theater and area saloons. Three Indians who remained in the village are known to have survived the massacre: George Bent's brother Charlie Bent, and two Cheyenne women who were later turned over to William Bent.  According to western author and historian Larry McMurtry, the son of Chivington's scout John Smith (by an Indian mother) was in the camp, survived the attack and was "executed" afterward.

Aftermath 

The Sand Creek Massacre resulted in a heavy loss of life, mostly among Cheyenne and Arapaho women and children. The hardest hit by the massacre were the Wutapiu, Black Kettle's band. Perhaps half of the Hevhaitaniu were lost, including the chiefs Yellow Wolf and Big Man. The Oivimana, led by War Bonnet, lost about half their number. There were heavy losses to the Hisiometanio (Ridge Men) under White Antelope. Chief One Eye was also killed, along with many of his band. The Suhtai clan and the Heviqxnipahis clan under chief Sand Hill experienced relatively few losses. The Dog Soldiers and the Masikota, who by that time had allied, were not present at Sand Creek. Of about 10 lodges of Arapaho under Chief Left Hand, representing about 50 or 60 people, only a handful escaped with their lives.

After hiding all day above the camp in holes dug beneath the bank of Sand Creek, the survivors there, many of whom were wounded, moved up the stream and spent the night on the prairie. Trips were made to the site of the camp but very few survivors were found there. After a cold night without shelter, the survivors set out toward the Cheyenne camp on the headwaters of the Smoky Hill River. They soon met up with other survivors who had escaped with part of the horse herd, some returning from the Smoky Hill camp where they had fled during the attack. They then proceeded to the camp, where they received assistance.

The massacre disrupted the traditional Cheyenne power structure, because of the deaths of eight members of the Council of Forty-Four. White Antelope, One Eye, Yellow Wolf, Big Man, Bear Man, War Bonnet, Spotted Crow, and Bear Robe were all killed, as were the headmen of some of the Cheyenne military societies. Among the chiefs killed were most of those who had advocated peace with white settlers and the U.S. government. The net effect of the murders and ensuing weakening of the peace faction exacerbated the developing social and political rift. Traditional council chiefs, mature men who sought consensus and looked to the future of their people, and their followers, were opposed by the younger and more militaristic Dog Soldiers.

Beginning in the 1830s, the Dog Soldiers had evolved from a Cheyenne military society of that name into a separate band of Cheyenne and Lakota warriors. They took as their territory the area around the headwaters of the Republican and Smoky Hill rivers in southern Nebraska, northern Kansas, and the northeastern Colorado Territory. By the 1860s, as the conflict between Indians and encroaching whites intensified, the Dog Soldiers and military societies within other Cheyenne bands countered the influence of the traditional Council of Forty-Four chiefs who, as more mature men, took a larger view and were more likely to favor peace with the whites. To the Dog Soldiers, the Sand Creek massacre illustrated the folly of the peace chiefs' policy of accommodating the whites through treaties such as the first Treaty of Fort Laramie and the Treaty of Fort Wise. They believed their militant position toward the whites was justified by the massacre.

The events at Sand Creek dealt a fatal blow to the traditional Cheyenne clan system and the authority of its Council of Chiefs. It had already been weakened by the numerous deaths due to the 1849 cholera epidemic, which killed perhaps half the Southern Cheyenne population, especially the Masikota and Oktoguna bands. It was further weakened by the emergence of the separate Dog Soldiers band.

Retaliation 
After the brutal slaughter of those who supported peace, many of the Cheyenne, including the great warrior Roman Nose, and many Arapaho joined the Dog Soldiers. They sought revenge on settlers throughout the Platte valley, including an 1865 attack on what became Fort Caspar, Wyoming.

Following the massacre, the survivors reached the camps of the Cheyenne on the Smokey Hill and Republican rivers. The war pipe was smoked and passed from camp to camp among the Sioux, Cheyenne, and Arapaho warriors in the area. In January 1865, they planned and carried out an attack with 1,000 warriors on the stage station and fort, then called Camp Rankin, at present-day Julesburg, Colorado. This was followed by numerous raids along the South Platte both east and west of Julesburg, and a second raid on the town of Julesburg in early February. The associated bands captured much loot and killed many white settlers, including men, women and children. The bulk of the Indians then moved north into Nebraska on their way to the Black Hills and the Powder River Country.

Black Kettle continued to speak for peace and did not join in the second raid or in the journey to the Powder River country. He left the camp and returned with 80 lodges to the Arkansas River to seek peace with the Coloradans.

Official investigations 

Initially, the Sand Creek engagement was reported as a victory against a brave and numerous foe. Within weeks, however, witnesses and survivors began telling stories of a possible massacre. Several investigations were conducted—two by the military, and one by the Joint Committee on the Conduct of the War. The panel declared:

Statements taken by Major Edward W. Wynkoop and his adjutant substantiated the later accounts of survivors. These statements were filed with his reports and can be found in the Official Records of the War of the Rebellion, copies of which were submitted as evidence in the Joint Committee of the Conduct of the War and in separate hearings conducted by the military in Denver. Lieutenant James D. Cannon describes the mutilation of human genitalia by the soldiers, "men, women, and children's privates cut out. I heard one man say that he had cut a woman's private parts out and had them for exhibition on a stick. I heard of one instance of a child, a few months old, being thrown into the feed-box of a wagon, and after being carried some distance, left on the ground to perish; I also heard of numerous instances in which men had cut out the private parts of females and stretched them over their saddle-bows, and some of them over their hats."

During these investigations, numerous witnesses came forward with damning testimony, almost all of which was corroborated by other witnesses. One witness, Captain Silas Soule, who had ordered the men under his command not to fire their weapons, was murdered in Denver just weeks after offering his testimony. However, despite the Joint Committee on the Conduct of the Wars' recommendation, no charges were brought against those who committed the massacre. Chivington was beyond the reach of army justice because he'd already resigned his commission. The closest thing to a punishment he suffered was the effective end of his political aspirations.

A monument installed on the Colorado State Capitol grounds in 1909 lists Sand Creek as one of the "battles and engagements" fought by Colorado troops in the American Civil War. In 2002, the Colorado Historical Society (now History Colorado), authorized by the Colorado General Assembly, added an additional plaque to the monument, which states that the original designers of the monument "mischaracterized" Sand Creek by calling it a battle.

Little Arkansas Treaty 
After the actual details of the massacre became widely known, the United States federal government sent a blue ribbon commission whose members were respected by the Indians, and the Treaty of the Little Arkansas was signed in 1865. It promised the Indians free access to the lands south of the Arkansas River, excluded them from the Arkansas River north to the Platte River, and promised land and cash reparations to the surviving descendants of Sand Creek victims.

However, the treaty was abrogated by Washington less than two years later, all major provisions were ignored, and instead, the Medicine Lodge Treaty reduced the reservation lands by 90 percent, located in much less desirable sites in Oklahoma. Later government actions further reduced the size of the reservations.

Remembrance 
The site, on Big Sandy Creek in Kiowa County, is now preserved by the National Park Service. The Sand Creek Massacre National Historic Site was dedicated on April 28, 2007, almost 142 years after the massacre. The American Battlefield Trust and its partners preserved 640 acres of Sand Creek and deeded it to the national historic site.

An exhibit about Sand Creek, titled Collision: The Sand Creek Massacre 1860s–Today, opened in 2012 with the new History Colorado Center in Denver. The exhibit immediately drew criticism from members of the Northern Cheyenne tribe. In April 2013, History Colorado agreed to close the exhibit to public view while consultations were made with the Northern Cheyenne.

On December 3, 2014, Colorado Governor John Hickenlooper formally apologized to descendants of Sand Creek massacre victims gathered in Denver to commemorate the 150th anniversary of the event. Hickenlooper stated, "We should not be afraid to criticize and condemn that which is inexcusable. ... On behalf of the State of Colorado, I want to apologize. We will not run from this history."

In 2015, construction of a memorial to the Sand Creek Massacre victims began on the Colorado Capitol grounds.

In October 2022, it was announced that almost  would be added to the National Historic Site to preserve for the tribes. "The Cheyenne and Arapaho Tribes are excited to see the additional 3,478 acres to the Sand Creek Massacre National Historic Site which is providing security for the protection of our Sacred site," said Cheyenne and Arapaho Tribes Governor Reggie Wassana in a statement. President Biden's Secretary of the Interior Deb Haaland announced of the preservation, "It is our solemn responsibility at the Department of the Interior, as caretakers of America's national treasures, to tell the story of our nation. The events that took place here forever changed the course of the Northern Cheyenne, Northern Arapaho, and Cheyenne and Arapaho Tribes."

In popular culture
The Sand Creek massacre has been depicted or referenced in multiple works, spanning a variety of media:

Comics
 Nemesis the Warlock in 2000 AD #504 (1986), depicts the massacre.
 The 30th chapter of Italian comic book saga Storia del West written by Gino D'Antonio, depicts themes of the massacre.

Films
The massacre has been portrayed in several western movies, including Tomahawk (1951), Massacre at Sand Creek  (Playhouse 90) (1956), The Guns of Fort Petticoat (1957), Soldier Blue (1970), The Last Warrior (1970),  Young Guns (1988), and Last of the Dogmen (1995). Little Big Man (1970), a much more famous and successful movie has an early scene of the Sand Creek Massacre. The Dustin Hoffman character saves a Cheyenne woman giving birth after watching her husband killed by the white soldiers. He then returns to his old tribe with her and takes her as his wife.

The massacre is referenced by Trevor Slattery in Iron Man 3 (2013).

Literature
 Sulle frontiere del Far-West (1909) by Emilio Salgari
 Cheyenne Autumn (1953) by Mari Sandoz
 A Very Small Remnant (1963) by Michael Straight
 Centennial (1974) by James Michener
 From Sand Creek (1981) by Simon Ortiz
 Bury My Heart at Wounded Knee (1971) by Dee Brown
 The Massacre at Sand Creek (1995) by Bruce Cutler
 Flight (2007) by Sherman Alexie
 Choke Creek (2009) by Lauren Small
 Young Sherlock Holmes: Fire Storm (2011) by Andrew Lane
 Remembering the Sand Creek Massacre: A Historical Review of Methodist Involvement, Influence, and Response (2016), by Gary L. Roberts
 There There (2018) by Tommy Orange depicts a fictionalized version of the event
 The Minutes by Tracy Letts has a fictionalized version of the event as a key plot point

Music
Songs about Sand Creek include Dreadzone's "Scalplock", Gila's "Black Kettle's Ballad", Five Iron Frenzy's "Banner Year", Peter La Farge's song "The Crimson Parson", and Fabrizio De André's "Fiume Sand Creek", and J.D. Blackfoot's ballad "The Song of Crazy Horse" on that same-titled LP. "Psalm of Sand Creek" was another song about the massacre by the country gothic band Sons of Perdition.

Television
 The Gunsmoke episode The Drummer, broadcast on October 9, 1972, includes descriptions and depictions of a similar incident, labeled the Rock Creek Massacre.
 The 1978 miniseries Centennial includes the Sand Creek massacre as part of Episode 5, "The Massacre".

 The Dr. Quinn, Medicine Woman episode "A Cowboy's Lullaby", broadcast on 20 February 1993, references the Sand Creek Massacre as a reason why the local Cheyenne tribe won't adopt an infant that is half-white.

 The West (1996) (Season 1, Episode 4), depicts the Sand Creek massacre.
 The 2005 miniseries Into the West includes the Sand Creek massacre as part of Episode 4, "Hell on Wheels".

See also
List of battles fought in Colorado

Footnotes

Bibliography 
 Official Records of the War of the Rebellion.
 
 Brown, Dee (1970). Bury My Heart at Wounded Knee: An Indian History of the American West. Owl Books. .
 Greene, Jerome A. (2004). Washita, The Southern Cheyenne and the U.S. Army. Campaigns and Commanders, vol. 3. Norman, OK: University of Oklahoma Press. .
 Hatch, Thom (2004). Black Kettle: The Cheyenne Chief Who Sought Peace but Found War. Hoboken, NJ: John Wiley & Sons. .
 Hoig, Stan (1977). The Sand Creek Massacre. Norman, OK: University of Oklahoma Press. .
 Hoig, Stan (1980). The Peace Chiefs of the Cheyennes. Norman, OK: University of Oklahoma Press. .
 Hyde, George E. (1968). Life of George Bent Written from His Letters. Ed. by Savoie Lottinville. Norman, OK: University of Oklahoma Press. .
 
 Michno, Gregory F. (2003). Encyclopedia of Indian Wars: Western Battles and Skirmishes 1850–1890. Missoula, MT: Mountain Press Publishing Company. .
 "Treaty of Fort Laramie with Sioux, Etc., 1851." 11 Stats. 749, Sept. 17, 1851. In Charles J. Kappler, compiler and editor, Indian Affairs: Laws and Treaties – Vol. II: Treaties. Washington, D.C.: Government Printing Office, 1904, pp. 594–596. Through Oklahoma State University Library, Electronic Publishing Center.
 "Treaty with the Arapaho and Cheyenne, 1861" (Treaty of Fort Wise). 12 Stat. 1163, Feb. 15, 1861. Ratified Aug. 6, 1861; proclaimed Dec. 5, 1861.  In Charles J. Kappler, compiler and editor, Indian Affairs: Laws and Treaties – Vol. II: Treaties. Washington, D.C.: Government Printing Office, 1904, pp. 807–811. Through Oklahoma State University Library, Electronic Publishing Center.
 United States Army. (1867). Courts of Inquiry, Sand Creek Massacre. Report of the Secretary of War Communicating, In Compliance With a Resolution of the Senate of February 4, 1867, a Copy of the Evidence Taken at Denver and Fort Lyon, Colorado Territory, By a Military Commission, Ordered to Inquire into the Sand Creek Massacre, November, 1864. Washington, DC: Government Printing Office. Senate Executive Document 26, 39th Congress, Second Session. Reproduced in Wynkoop, Christopher H. (2004-08-13). "Inquiry into the Sand Creek Massacre, November, 1864." The Wynkoop Family Research Library. Rootsweb.com: Freepages. Retrieved on 2007-04-29.
 United States Congress. (1867). Condition of the Indian Tribes. Report of the Joint Special Committee Appointed Under Joint Resolution of March 3, 1865, with an Appendix. Washington, DC: Government Printing Office.
 United States Senate. (1865). "Massacre of the Cheyenne Indians". Report of the Joint Committee on The Conduct of the War. (3 vols.) Senate Report No. 142, 38th Congress, Second Session. Washington, DC: Government Printing Office. pp. I–VI, 3–108
 West, Elliott (1998). The Contested Plains: Indians, Goldseekers, and the Rush to Colorado. University Press of Kansas. .
 Winger, Kevin (August 17, 2007). "Trail Helps Mark 1864 Massacre". Cheyenne Wyoming Tribune-Eagle.
 Jackson, Helen. (1994). A Century of Dishonor. United States: Indian Head Books. .

Further reading
Bensing, Tom. Silas Soule: A Short, Eventful Life of Moral Courage .
 Mendoza, Patrick M. With foreword by Ben Nighthorse Campbell, 1993. Song of Sorrow: Massacre at Sand Creek. Denver, CO: Willow Wind Publishing Co. 
Kelman, Ari (2013). A Misplaced Massacre: Struggling Over the Memory of Sand Creek. Cambridge, MA: Harvard University Press. .

External links 

 
 Sand Creek Massacre Historic Site at National Park Service website
 Report of the United States Congress Joint Committee on the Conduct of the War, 1865 at University of Michigan Digital Library Production Service, University of Michigan
 Sand Creek Massacre Documentary Film Project
 Treaty with the Apache, Cheyenne, and Arapaho; October 17, 1865. full text of the Little Arkansas Treaty on the Yale Law School website
 Colorado Experience: Sand Creek Massacre (Rocky Mountain PBS)

1864 in Colorado Territory
1864 murders in the United States
Massacres in 1864
Massacres of the American Civil War
Arapaho
Battles of the Trans-Mississippi Theater of the American Civil War
Cheyenne tribe
Colorado in the American Civil War
Colorado Territory
Conflicts in 1864
Genocidal massacres
Indian wars of the American Old West
Kiowa County, Colorado
Mass murder in Colorado
Massacres of Native Americans
Native American history of Colorado
Union victories of the American Civil War
United States military scandals
United States military war crimes
November 1864 events
Massacres in the United States
C
Ethnic cleansing in the United States
Battles in Colorado
Massacres committed by the United States
Mass murder in the United States